The 1980–81 Michigan State Spartans men's basketball team represented Michigan State University in the 1980–81 NCAA Division I men's basketball season. The team played their home games at Jenison Field House in East Lansing, Michigan and were members of the Big Ten Conference. They were coached by Jud Heathcote in his fifth year at Michigan State. The Spartans finished with a record of 13–14, 7–11 to finish in eighth place in Big Ten play.

Previous season
The Spartans finished the 1979–80 season 12–15, 6–12 in Big Ten play to finish in ninth place in conference.

Roster and statistics 

Source

Schedule and results

|-
!colspan=9 style=| Non-conference regular season

|-
!colspan=9 style=|Big Ten regular season

Awards and honors
 Jay Vincent – All-Big Ten First Team

References

Michigan State Spartans men's basketball seasons
Michigan State
Michigan State Spartans men's b
Michigan